Dalibor Svrčina (born 2 October 2002) is a Czech tennis player. He has achieved a career-high ATP singles ranking of World No. 167 on 18 July 2022 and a doubles ranking of No. 341 on 7 November 2022.

Junior career
He achieved a career-high ITF juniors ranking of World No. 8.
Svrčina and his partner Jonáš Forejtek won the 2019 Australian Open boys' doubles title, beating Emilio Nava and Cannon Kingsley in the finals.

Professional career

2021: First Challenger title, Top 300 debut
In August Svrčina won his first Challenger title as a wildcard at the 2021 ATP Prague Open where he defeated Dmitry Popko. As a result he reached the top 350 at a career-high of No. 334 on 16 August 2021. He reached the top 300 on 15 November 2021 at No. 298.

2022: Top 200 debut
In April Svrčina reached his second Challenger final at the 2022 ATP Prague Open where he lost to Sebastian Ofner. As a result he reached the top 200 at a career-high of World No. 199 on 2 May 2022.

2023: Grand Slam debut and first ATP & Major win
In January, Svrčina qualified for the 2023 Australian Open to make his Grand Slam debut. He defeated Jaume Munar for his first ATP and Grand Slam win.

Grand Slam singles performance timeline

Performance Timeline

Current through the 2023 Australian Open

Challenger and World Tennis Tour finals

Singles: 6 (2–4)

Junior Grand Slam finals

Boys' doubles

References

External links 
 
 
 
 

2002 births
Living people
Czech male tennis players
Australian Open (tennis) junior champions
Sportspeople from Ostrava
Tennis players at the 2018 Summer Youth Olympics
Grand Slam (tennis) champions in boys' doubles